The 2017 Las Vegas 350 was the 18th stock car race of the 2017 NASCAR Camping World Truck Series, the second race of the 2017 NASCAR Camping World Truck Series playoffs, the second race of the Round of 8, and the 21st iteration of the event. The race was held on Saturday, September 30, 2017, in North Las Vegas, Nevada at Las Vegas Motor Speedway, a  permanent D-shaped racetrack. The race took the scheduled 146 laps to complete. At race's end, Ben Rhodes, driving for ThorSport Racing, held off a charging Christopher Bell for his first career NASCAR Camping World Truck Series win. He would also earn a spot in the next round of the playoffs. To fill out the podium, Chase Briscoe of Brad Keselowski Racing would finish third, respectively.

Background 

The race was held at Las Vegas Motor Speedway, which is a  complex of multiple tracks for motorsports racing. The complex is owned by Speedway Motorsports, Inc., which is headquartered in Charlotte, North Carolina. It is located in Clark County, Nevada in Las Vegas, Nevada about 15 miles northeast of the Las Vegas Strip.

Entry list 

 (R) denotes rookie driver.

Practice

First practice 
The first practice session was held on Saturday, September 30, at 8:30 AM PST. The session would last for 55 minutes.

Final practice 
The final practice session was held on Saturday, September 30, at 10:00 AM CST. The session would last for 55 minutes.

Qualifying 
Qualifying was held on Saturday, September 23, at 3:10 PM CST. Since Las Vegas Motor Speedway is at least , the qualifying system was a single car, single lap, two round system where in the first round, everyone would set a time to determine positions 13–32. Then, the fastest 12 qualifiers would move on to the second round to determine positions 1–12.

Full qualifying results

Race results 
Stage 1 Laps: 35

Stage 2 Laps: 35

Stage 3 Laps: 76

Standings after the race 

Drivers' Championship standings

Note: Only the first 8 positions are included for the driver standings.

References 

2017 NASCAR Camping World Truck Series
NASCAR races at Las Vegas Motor Speedway
September 2017 sports events in the United States
2017 in sports in Nevada